The 1963 Brown Bears football team was an American football team that represented Brown University during the 1963 NCAA University Division football season. Brown finished second-to-last in the Ivy League. 

In their fifth season under head coach John McLaughry, the Bears compiled a 3–5 record and were outscored 168 to 157. B. Bucci and A. Matteo were the team captains. The team played eight games, rather than the usual nine, because the season-ender against Colgate was canceled following the assassination of John F. Kennedy.

The Bears' 2–5 conference record placed seventh in the Ivy League standings. They were outscored by Ivy opponents 161 to 124. 

Brown played its home games at Brown Stadium in Providence, Rhode Island.

Schedule

References

Brown
Brown Bears football seasons
Brown Bears football